Jaee is a village and a Gram Panchayat in Meerut district in the Indian State "Uttar Pradesh".

Villages in Meerut district